Semen Radulov (born August 30, 1989 in Odessa) is a Ukrainian freestyle wrestler. He won a bronze medal in the 2016 European Wrestling Championships held in Riga, Latvia.

References

External links
 bio on unitedworldwrestling.org

Living people
1989 births
Ukrainian male sport wrestlers
Universiade medalists in wrestling
Universiade bronze medalists for Ukraine
European Wrestling Championships medalists
Medalists at the 2013 Summer Universiade
Sportspeople from Odesa
20th-century Ukrainian people
21st-century Ukrainian people